The 2012 British Grand Prix (formally the 2012 Formula 1 Santander British Grand Prix) was a Formula One motor race that took place at the Silverstone Circuit in Northamptonshire and Buckinghamshire, England on 8 July 2012. It was the ninth round of the 2012 Formula One season, the 63rd time the event had been a round of the Formula One World Championship, and the 67th time it had been contested overall. The 52-lap race was won by Red Bull driver Mark Webber, who took his second victory of the season. The Ferrari of Fernando Alonso, who started the race in pole position, finished 3.0 seconds behind Webber, in second. Webber's teammate, Sebastian Vettel, completed the podium by finishing in third position.

As a consequence of the race, Webber narrowed Alonso's lead in the drivers' standings to 13 points. Webber himself was 16 points ahead of Vettel, who had moved ahead of Lewis Hamilton into third in the standings on 100 points. Red Bull extended their lead in the constructors' standings to 64 points. Ferrari moved up from fourth place to second whilst McLaren did the reverse and Lotus stayed in third position. All three teams stayed within 10 points of each other.

This would prove to be Webber's 9th and final career F1 victory and the last Red Bull Racing victory at Silverstone until Max Verstappen won the 70th Anniversary Grand Prix there in 2020.

Report

Background
Jean-Éric Vergne was given a ten-place grid penalty for the race after causing an avoidable collision with Heikki Kovalainen during the previous race. Kamui Kobayashi took a five-place grid penalty for the same offence, having caused an avoidable collision with Felipe Massa in Valencia.

After out-qualifying Toro Rosso drivers Vergne and Daniel Ricciardo in Valencia, Caterham announced plans to bring several upgrades for the CT-01 chassis to the race. Marussia joined Caterham in bringing significant updates to their car, which the Russian team described as their "first proper windtunnel-generated update" since abandoning their computational fluid dynamics-only approach at the start of the 2012 season. Test driver María de Villota was involved in a serious accident while carrying out a straight-line aerodynamic test of the upgraded MR01 chassis in the week preceding the race at Duxford Aerodrome. She was removed from the car with life-threatening injuries, including skull fractures and the loss of her right eye.

Like the 2011 British Grand Prix, tyre supplier Pirelli brought its silver-banded hard compound tyre as the harder "prime" tyre and the yellow-banded soft compound tyre as the softer "option" tyre.

Dani Clos replaced Narain Karthikeyan at HRT for the first practice session, having previously driven the car at the Spanish Grand Prix. Valtteri Bottas took Bruno Senna's seat at Williams, while Jules Bianchi drove Nico Hülkenberg's car for Force India for the duration of the session.

Free Practice

The teams were due to test an "experimental" hard tyre compound developed by Pirelli during the first free practice, with a view to introducing it as a racing tyre later in the season; however, wet conditions made this impossible. Romain Grosjean was the fastest driver in the first session, ahead of Daniel Ricciardo and Lewis Hamilton. Fernando Alonso and the Force Indias of Paul di Resta and Jules Bianchi elected not to set lap times in the face of the difficult conditions.

The second session was similarly washed out and saw limited running as teams tried to preserve their wet- and intermediate-compound tyres. Hamilton was fastest, leading Kamui Kobayashi and Michael Schumacher as Grosjean elected not to set a time. Bruno Senna brought out a red flag that resulted in a ten-minute stop to the session when he hit a patch of standing water at Becketts, spinning and crashing heavily into the barriers. Fernando Alonso also encountered trouble, spinning and hitting the wall late in the session, but the Ferrari driver was able to return to the pits.

The third and final session was declared dry, but was run under the threat of rain and saw plenty of activity as the teams pushed hard to make up for lost time running in the wet on Friday. Charles Pic stopped on the circuit after twenty minutes, forcing the temporary suspension of the session while his car was removed. Pic later returned to the circuit, but stopped once again, and his car was removed by marshalls without forcing the session to be stopped. Alonso ended the session fastest overall.

Qualifying
Qualifying started in wet conditions, and with the threat of more rain on the way, a queue of cars formed at the end of pit lane in the minutes before the session began. Once out, many drivers were instructed by their teams to keep going with their flying laps, even if they felt they had been impeded by a slower car because the rapidly evolving nature of the circuit meant that they could still set a fast lap time. Jenson Button was eliminated in eighteenth position when he could not find clear track space. His final flying lap saw him set sector times that would have been fast enough to avoid elimination by over a second and a half, but a spin on the main straight by Timo Glock brought out yellow flags, prompting Button to back off, where he was duly eliminated. Vitaly Petrov out-qualified teammate Heikki Kovalainen for the second time in 2012, with the Caterhams starting in eighteenth and nineteenth once grid penalties had been applied. Despite his spin, Glock's fastest lap saw him qualify twentieth, ahead of both HRT drivers, with Pedro de la Rosa once again out-qualifying Narain Karthikeyan. Charles Pic failed to set a lap time within 107% of the fastest time in the session, set by Sebastian Vettel.

The weather delivered on its promise of more rain, inundating the circuit ahead of Q2. The session was red-flagged with just over six minutes remaining after four cars span off within the space of a minute, and Sauber's Sergio Pérez at the top of the time sheets. The stoppage lasted for ninety-two minutes while race officials waited for the rain to stop and the circuit to clear. When the session re-opened, the seventeen drivers would have enough time left over for one set of flying laps, forcing them to choose between the intermediate and wet-weather compounds as the length of a lap in the wet meant that the drivers would not have enough time to pit and change tyres if they made the wrong choice. Pérez chose the intermediate compound which quickly proved to be the wrong choice as he rapidly plummeted down the order, and finished slowest. He would start the race fifteenth after penalties were applied. Paul di Resta's final lap gave him a provisional start in Q3, but he was eliminated in the final moments of the session and started eleventh. Kamui Kobayashi was twelfth, but dropped to seventeenth when his penalty from Valencia was applied. Nico Rosberg and Daniel Ricciardo finished thirteenth and fourteenth, ahead of Bruno Senna who admitted to being "too conservative" in qualifying. Jean-Éric Vergne qualified sixteenth, but was moved to the back of the grid once his penalty was applied. Romain Grosjean made it through to Q3, but spun at the end of the period at the Vale chicane, and took no further part in the session.

Q3 was fought between the Ferraris, Red Bulls and Michael Schumacher's Mercedes. Fernando Alonso and Felipe Massa quickly locked out the front row of the grid, until late laps from Mark Webber and Sebastian Vettel left the Red Bull cars first and second. Massa was unable to improve his lap time and finished fifth, while Schumacher pushed Webber off pole. Webber reclaimed it with his next lap, only to lose it in turn to Alonso on the Spaniard's final lap of the session. Kimi Räikkönen, the last driver to set a time, finished sixth, ahead of Pastor Maldonado and Lewis Hamilton. Nico Hülkenberg was ninth, which became fourteenth when he took a five-place grid penalty for a gearbox change.

Race

An engine failure on Vitaly Petrov's Caterham on his way round to the grid meant he had to return to the pits and retire the car before the race had even begun. When it did, however, it was polesitter Alonso who maintained his lead into the first corner. Webber and Schumacher followed him round in their same positions, but Vettel fell prey to Massa and Räikkönen, before quickly getting back past the Finn. Paul di Resta, in tenth place at the time, suffered a puncture as a result of his right rear tyre coming into contact with Romain Grosjean's front wing at the start of the Wellington straight. Di Resta spun and retired from the damage on the following lap whilst Grosjean pitted on the third lap to replace his front wing and change tyres after his impaired front wing was costing him places.

Later on in the race, Sergio Pérez and Pastor Maldonado had an incident at Brooklands at the end of the Wellington Straight. Maldonado tried to overtake Pérez on the inside of the corner under braking, whilst Pérez was defending on the inside line Maldonado's front wing clipped Pérez's car and sent both of them into a spin, the result of this would be Pérez retiring from the race and Maldonado having to make an unscheduled pit stop to repair damage to his front wing. This would be a disaster for his strategy in the race because a lap earlier, he pitted for new tyres, Maldonado would later finish 16th in the race.

At the start of lap 50, Mark Webber was closing in on race leader Fernando Alonso, with Vettel shortly behind his teammate in 3rd place. Webber was faster than Alonso due to his tyres being worn more than Webber's, but then with 3 laps to go Webber was within a second of Alonso's car, this would mean he was eligible to use DRS in the allocated DRS zone on the Wellington Straight, this would give him extra speed. Alonso knew he was slower than Webber so he took the inside line as Webber passed Alonso for the lead of the race, Alonso tried to attack on him in the next few corners. Now Vettel would try and close up on Alonso.

When the chequered flag fell, Mark Webber won his second British Grand Prix, following his victory in 2010. Alonso was 2nd, Vettel not having the pace to catch Alonso and remaining 3rd. Felipe Massa finished 5 seconds behind Vettel, Romain Grosjean recovered from the first lap incident to finish sixth, behind his teammate Kimi Räikkönen. The other points scorers were Schumacher, Hamilton, Senna, and Jenson Button in 10th.

Post-race
Pastor Maldonado from the Williams team received a 10,000 euro fine for an incident with Sauber's Sergio Pérez.

Sauber's other driver Kamui Kobayashi received a 25,000 euro fine for crashing into four pit crew members in a manoeuvre that was described as a 'very dangerous move which had potentially serious implications'.

The race also introduced a twist in the post-race television unilateral interview; instead of Webber, Alonso, and Vettel proceeding to the interview room in the media centre, Jackie Stewart conducted the televised interview on the podium, allowing the drivers to address the crowd directly. The drivers then proceeded to the interview room for the press conference with assembled media. This form of post-race interviewing was used in every race until the 2018 Chinese Grand Prix.

Classification

Qualifying

Notes:
 – Nico Hülkenberg was given a five-place grid penalty for changing his gearbox.
 – Kamui Kobayashi was given a five-place grid penalty for causing an avoidable accident with Felipe Massa in Valencia.
 – Jean-Éric Vergne was given a ten-place grid penalty for causing an avoidable accident with Heikki Kovalainen in Valencia.
 – Charles Pic failed to set a lap time within 107% of the fastest lap time set in Q1. His entry into the race depended on an injunction from the race stewards. He received a five-place grid penalty for changing his gearbox, before being given permission to enter the race by the stewards, leaving him twenty-fourth overall.

Race

Championship standings after the race 

Drivers' Championship standings

Constructors' Championship standings

 Note: Only the top five positions are included for both sets of standings.

See also 
 2012 Silverstone GP2 Series round
 2012 Silverstone GP3 Series round

References

British
British Grand Prix
Grand Prix
British Grand Prix
Sport in Buckinghamshire
Sport in Northamptonshire
British Grand Prix
2010s in Buckinghamshire